Lincoln is a civil parish in Sunbury County, New Brunswick, Canada.

For governance purposes it is divided between the city of Fredericton and the local service districts of Rusagonis-Waasis and the parish of Lincoln, all of which are members of Regional Service Commission 11 (RSC11).

Origin of name
The parish may have been named for its proximity to York County, as the traditional English counties of Lincolnshire and Yorkshire shared a border.

Another possible source is Lincoln, Massachusetts, former home of the Glasier family who settled there.

History
Lincoln was erected in 1786 as one of Sunbury County's original parishes. It extended to Charlotte County and included most of Gladstone Parish.

In 1835 the rear of the parish was included in the newly erected Blissville Parish.

Boundaries
Lincoln Parish is bounded:

 on the northeast by the Saint John River;
 on the southeast by the Oromocto River;
 on the southwest by a line beginning on the Oromocto River about 1.2 kilometres downstream of the mouth of Shaw Creek and running north 66º west to the York County line;
 on the northwest by the York County line;
 including Thatch Island in the Saint John River.

Communities
Communities at least partly within the parish. bold indicates an incorporated municipality

 Fredericton
  Lincoln
 Lower Lincoln
 Nevers Road
  Rusagonis
 Rusagonis Station
 Sunpoke
  Waasis

Bodies of water
Bodies of water at least partly within the parish.

 Oromocto River
  Saint John River
 Little Waasis Stream
 Rusagonis Stream
 Waasis Stream
 The Thoroughfare
 Bear Creek
 Deer Creek
 Shaw Creek
 Wilmot Creek
 Sunpoke Lake

Islands
Islands at least partly within the parish.
 Thatch Island

Other notable places
Parks, historic sites, and other noteworthy places at least partly within the parish.
 Fredericton International Airport
 Vanier Industrial Park

Demographics
Parish population does not include portion within Fredericton

Population
Population trend

Language
Mother tongue (2016)

See also
List of parishes in New Brunswick

Notes

References

External links
 City of Fredericton
 Lincoln Local Service District
 Rusagonis-Waasis LSD Information Page

Parishes of Sunbury County, New Brunswick